The Kokoda mogurnda (Mogurnda lineata) is a species of fish in the family Eleotridae endemic to Papua New Guinea, where it is an inhabitant of clear streams in the rainforest.

References

Mogurnda
Freshwater fish of Papua New Guinea
Taxonomy articles created by Polbot
Fish described in 1991